Edmund Gerber (born 2 August 1988) is a German former professional boxer who competed from 2007 to 2018. At regional level, he challenged once for the European heavyweight title in 2013. As an amateur, he won a bronze medal at the 2006 EU Junior Championships.

Amateur career
Gerber was a successful amateur on junior level, winning gold at the 2005 European cadet (U17) championships and bronze in 2006 European Junior championships where he lost to eventual winner Remzi Ozbek.

Professional career
Gerber made his professional debut in 2007.

In 2009 he stopped Marcel Zeller (record 22-4) and Shawn McLean (4-4) who had recently KOd undefeated (38-0) Faruq Saleem but didn't create a lot of interest with his first 9 bouts. 
That changed significantly in 2010 when he not only beat the experienced southpaw René Dettweiler (record 25-2 with a win over Gbenga Oloukun) but was also the first fighter to stop him, needing just two rounds for it. He also got a TKO win against Michael Sprott but was losing this fight heavily, it was a controversial stoppage as Michael Sprott got to his feet by the 8 count and looked well enough to continue. However three months later for the first time in his pro career, Edmund lost the rematch with Sprott by majority decision.

Professional boxing record

References

External links
 

|}

Heavyweight boxers
Living people
1988 births
Sportspeople from Schwerin
Place of birth missing (living people)
German male boxers